Mothonica is a genus of moths in the family Depressariidae.

Species
Mothonica cubana Duckworth, 1969
Mothonica fluminata (Meyrick, 1912)
Mothonica ocellea Forbes, 1930
Mothonica periapta Walsingham, 1912

Former species
Mothonica kimballi Duckworth, 1964

References

, 1969: Bredin-Archbold-Smithsonian biological survey of Dominica: West Indian Stenomidae (Lepidoptera: Gelechioidea). Smithsonian Contributions to Zoology 4: 1-21. Full article: 

 
Stenomatinae